Mary Burnett may refer to:
 Mary Couts Burnett, American philanthropist
 Mary Ann Burnett, British botanist, author and editor
 Mary Burnett Talbert, née Burnett, American orator, activist, suffragist and reformer